Jean Marie Chérestal (born 18 June 1947) was prime minister of Haïti from 2 March 2001 to 21 January 2002. He is the leader of the political party known as Pont ("bridge").

He was Minister of Finance from 1995 to 1996.

References

Prime Ministers of Haiti
Finance ministers of Haiti
1947 births
Living people
Candidates for President of Haiti
21st-century Haitian politicians